Amadeo Scarpi (15 September 1917 – 2011) was an Italian rower. He competed at the 1952 Summer Olympics in Helsinki with the men's coxed four where they were eliminated in the semi-final repêchage.

References

1917 births
2011 deaths 
Italian male rowers
Olympic rowers of Italy
Rowers at the 1952 Summer Olympics
European Rowing Championships medalists